Benjamín González Gómez (12 April 1958 – 6 June 2011) was an athlete from Spain. He competed in the 400 and 800 metres.

González won a bronze medal in 400 m at the 1982 European Indoor Championships. At the inaugural World Indoor Games in 1985 he and finished second in the 800 metres behind compatriot Colomán Trabado. On the national level, he became Spanish 400 metres champion in 1980, 1981 and 1982.

González's personal best 800 m time was 1:46.53 minutes, achieved in June 1985 in Madrid.

References

1958 births
2011 deaths
Spanish male middle-distance runners
Spanish male sprinters
Athletes (track and field) at the 1980 Summer Olympics
Athletes (track and field) at the 1984 Summer Olympics
Olympic athletes of Spain
Mediterranean Games bronze medalists for Spain
Mediterranean Games medalists in athletics
Athletes (track and field) at the 1983 Mediterranean Games
World Athletics Indoor Championships medalists
20th-century Spanish people